Ermsdorf is a village and former commune in eastern Luxembourg. It is part of the canton of Diekirch, which is part of the district of Diekirch.

, the village of Ermsdorf, which lies in the south of the commune, has a population of 221.

Since 2011, Ermsdorf has merged with Medernach to become the "Aerenzdallgemeng" (commune Vallée de l'Ernz, Ernztalgemeinde)

Former commune
The former commune consisted of the villages:

 Eppeldorf
 Ermsdorf
 Folkendeng
 Keiwelbach
 Stegen
 Backesmillen (lieu-dit)
 Bricherheck (lieu-dit)
 Bricherhaff (lieu-dit)
 Gilcher (lieu-dit)
 Hessemillen (lieu-dit)
 Hoossebierg (lieu-dit)
 Moderhaff (lieu-dit)
 Neimillen (lieu-dit)
 Reisermillen (lieu-dit)
 Spierberich (lieu-dit)
 Webeschhaff (lieu-dit)

Diekirch (canton)
Former communes of Luxembourg
Villages in Luxembourg